or  is an uninhabited island in Kvænangen Municipality in Troms og Finnmark county, Norway. The  island is located in the middle of the Kvænangen fjord, south of the island of Spildra. The last permanent resident of the island moved off the island around 1980, and the island has had no permanent inhabitants since then. It is only accessible by boat.

History
The island was the historical center of the municipality of Kvænangen. The municipal government and Skorpa Church were located on the island. The Skorpa prisoner of war camp was located on the island during World War II. The municipal government moved to Burfjord on the mainland during the 20th century and the island's population continued to decline until around 1980, when the island became uninhabited.

See also
List of islands of Norway

References

Kvænangen
Uninhabited islands of Norway
Islands of Troms og Finnmark